The Whittaker MW6 is a family of British amateur-built aircraft that was designed by Mike Whittaker and supplied as plans for amateur construction.

Design and development
The MW6 series is based upon the earlier single-seat Whittaker MW5 Sorcerer. The MW6 features a strut-braced parasol wing, a two-seat open cockpit, fixed tricycle landing gear and a single engine in tractor configuration, mounted on the keel tube, above the cockpit.

The aircraft is made from aluminium tubing, with its flying surfaces covered in doped aircraft fabric. The standard engine used is the  Rotax 503 two-stroke powerplant.

The design is Whittaker's most popular aircraft, with over 200 sets of plans sold. It is approved by the Light Aircraft Association in the UK.

Operational history
Bayerl et al. said of the MW6S and MW6T, "Both are very solid and safe, though performance doesn't match the latest hotships."

Variants

MW6S Fatboy
Model with side-by-side configuration seating
MW6T Merlin
Model with tandem seating

Specifications (MW6S Fatboy)

References

External links

Photo of Whittaker MW6T Merlin
Photo of Whittaker MW6S Fatboy

Homebuilt aircraft
Single-engined tractor aircraft
Parasol-wing aircraft